Towering Toccata is an album by Argentine composer, pianist and conductor Lalo Schifrin recorded in 1976 and released on the CTI label.

Reception
The Allmusic review states "it isn't the ideal follow-up to Black Widow that Schifrin fans might have hoped for. That said, the album has enough strong tunes and enough of a consistent sound to please hardcore Lalo Schifrin fans and anyone who loved Black Widow".  
  The song "Roller Coaster" would be re-recorded and released on Schifrin's soundtrack to the 1977 film Rollercoaster.

Track listing
All compositions by Lalo Schifrin except as indicated
 "Towering Toccata" (Johann Sebastian Bach) - 5:04 
 "Frances' Theme" - 4:19 
 "Macumba" - 6:12 
 "Eagles in Love" - 2:51 
 "Theme from King Kong" (John Barry) - 4:12 
 "Most Wanted Theme" - 2:44 
 "Midnight Woman" - 6:07 
 "Roller Coaster" - 4:45 
Recorded at Van Gelder Studio in Englewood Cliffs, New Jersey on October 18 & 20 and December 21, 1976

Personnel
Lalo Schifrin - piano, keyboards, arranger, conductor
Burt Collins, John Frosk, John Gatchell - trumpet 
Urbie Green - trombone
Joe Farrell, Jeremy Steig - flute
Gerry Niewood - alto saxophone
David Tofani, Lou Marini - tenor saxophone, flute
Ronnie Cuber - baritone saxophone
Clark Spangler - keyboards
Eric Gale, John Tropea - guitar
Will Lee - bass
Steve Gadd - drums, dahka-de-bello
Max Ellen, Paul Gershman, Emanuel Green, Charles Libove, Marvin Morgenstern, David Nadien, Max Pollikoff, Matthew Raimondi - violin
Lamar Alsop, Manny Vardi - viola
Charles McCracken, Alan Shulman - cello

References

CTI Records albums
Lalo Schifrin albums
1977 albums
Albums produced by Creed Taylor
Albums recorded at Van Gelder Studio
Albums arranged by Lalo Schifrin